The Golden Village is a commercial district in Richmond, British Columbia, Canada, with a high concentration of Asian-themed shopping malls. According to the 2016 Canadian Census, 54 percent of Richmond's population identify their ethnic origin as Chinese. As such, the Golden Village boasts a high density of not only Chinese but all varieties of Asian shops and restaurants.

Location

Golden Village's approximate borders are Sea Island Way to the north, Garden City Road to the east, Alderbridge Way to the south and about 300 metres west of No. 3 Road to the west. Most commercial buildings are accessible from the west side of Hazelbridge Way.

It is considered part of the city's main commercial district, extended from its original area around No. 3 Road and Westminster Highway.

Major commercial facilities

Transportation

Golden Village is served by public transit provided by regional transit authority TransLink. Since 2009, the area is connected to Vancouver and to central Richmond by the SkyTrain's Canada Line, which serves Aberdeen station within Golden Village.

There are also bus connections in Golden Village to other Richmond neighbourhoods such as Richmond Centre and Steveston, neighbouring cities such as New Westminster and Burnaby, and the University of British Columbia.

Golden Village is directly connected to Richmond's Sea Island, home to Vancouver International Airport, via the Moray Bridge and the Sea Island Bridge.

See also
Chinese Canadians in British Columbia

References

External links
Tourism Richmond's Golden Village brochure (PDF file)
Tourism BC: Richmond (includes the Golden Village)

News sources

 

Neighbourhoods in Richmond, British Columbia
Chinese-Canadian culture in British Columbia
Ethnic enclaves in British Columbia